Orthocerida is an order of extinct Orthoceratoid cephalopods also known as the Michelinocerida that lived from the Early Ordovician possibly to the Late Triassic. A fossil found in the Caucasus suggests they may even have survived until the Early Cretaceous. They were most common however from the Ordovician to the Devonian.

Shell form 

The shell is usually long, and may be straight ("orthoconic") or gently curved.  In life, these animals may have been similar to the modern squid, except for the long shell. The internal structure of the shell consists of concavo-convex chambers linked by a centrally-placed tube called a siphuncle. There is a tendency for the chambers to develop cameral deposits, which were used as ballast to balance the long gas-filled shell. Depending on the family, the siphuncle has orthochoanitic (short and straight) or cyrtochoanitic (outwardly curved) septal necks, which protrude from the septa. The shell surface may be (depending on the species or genus) smooth, transversely ribbed, or ornamented by a network of fine lirae.  Fossils are common and have been found on many continents, including the Americas, Africa, Europe, and Asia.

Ecology 

Orthocerids may have swum near the sea bed with their buoyant shell resting horizontally in the water, although some have suggested they floated more passively among the plankton or rested on the sea floor.  Like modern cephalopods they would have used jet-propulsion for locomotion.  However, the long bulky shell and relatively weak muscle attachments make it unlikely that they were as agile as ammonoids or modern cephalopods. They most likely fed on trilobites and small arthropods.

Taxonomy 

Orthocerid taxonomy is based on characters found in the shell, principally in the nature of the siphuncle. It is not without its problems however since features can appear repeatedly by the process of homeomorphy (convergent evolution), making certain taxa appear to have a much longer stratigraphic range than in actuality.

A recent study of very well preserved embryonic shells of the family Pseudorthoceratidae from the Mississippian (Lower Carboniferous) Imo Formation of Arkansas (Kröger and Mapes 2004) reveals that the morphologic diversity of the early growth stages of these creatures is more diverse than would be expected. Although this indicates that the Pseudorthoceratidae may be in need of revision, it also shows the value of embryonic shell morphology in understanding orthocerid phylogeny.

Evolutionary history 

The orthocerids probably arose from the Baltoceratidae, a family of the Ellesmerocerida.

However, several workers have disputed the monophyly of the Orthocerida as traditionally defined, and some have criticized it as a "nightmare for taxonomists" lacking clearly defined characters. Orthocerida as usually understood may thus be a polyphyletic group, having arisen as several lineages from early Ordovician cephalopods.  Some workers have split off the Pseudorthocerida and Dissidocerida as separate orders, the latter on the grounds that it arose from a different baltoceratid ancestor.  The pseudorthocerids are thought to be distinct because their protoconch and septal necks are so different.

Orthocerids flourished in the Paleozoic Era, giving rise to such intriguing forms as the ascocerids. Moreover, the spherical protoconch, or first chamber, of some orthocerids suggests they were ancestors to the Bactritida, small orthoconic forms that gave rise to both the ammonoids and coleoids. Fossilized radulas from orthocerids also suggest a closer affinity with modern coleoids than with Nautilus.

There is some dispute when the orthocerids finally became extinct.  Although they are often said to have survived into the Triassic Period, the two genera that date from that period may actually be pseudorthocerids. In that case, the last orthocerids may date only to the Permian.  However, the discovery in the Caucasus of a possible orthocerid from the Early Cretaceous Period suggests that they may have endured much longer as a ghost lineage.

References 
 
 
 Kröger, Bjorn, & Mapes, R. (2004) Embryonic orthoceratid nautiloids of the Imo Formation (Lower Carboniferous-Upper Chesterian) of Arkansas (USA). Journal of Paleontology 78: 560-573, Iowa City. pdf; GSA presentation
 Sweet, Walter C., (1964), Nautiloidea—Orthocerida, in Treatise on Invertebrate Paleontology. Part K. Mollusca 3. (Geological Society of America, and University of Kansas Press, New York, New York and Lawrence, Kansas)

External links
 www.palaeos.com
 Orthocerida (Fossil Nautiloidea Page)

 
Prehistoric cephalopod orders
Mesozoic cephalopods
Paleozoic cephalopods
Early Ordovician first appearances
Triassic extinctions
Paraphyletic groups